Jana Macurová (born 14 October 1978) is a former professional Czech tennis player.

Macurová reached a record singles ranking high of world no. 276 and even ranked World No. 200 in doubles during her playing career. She won 21 different ITF titles.

ITF Circuit finals

Singles (6–9)

Doubles (15–15)

References 
 
 

1978 births
Living people
Czech female tennis players